A Funny Thing Happened on the Way to the Forum is a 1966 period musical comedy film, directed by Richard Lester, with Zero Mostel and Jack Gilford reprising their stage roles. It also features Buster Keaton in his final screen role; Phil Silvers, for whom the stage musical was originally intended; and regular Lester collaborators Michael Crawford, Michael Hordern and Roy Kinnear.

The film was adapted for the screen by Melvin Frank and Michael Pertwee from the stage musical of the same name with music and lyrics by Stephen Sondheim, and book by Burt Shevelove and Larry Gelbart, which was inspired by the farces of the ancient Roman playwright Plautus (251–183 BC) – specifically Pseudolus, Miles Gloriosus and Mostellaria – and tells the bawdy story of a slave named Pseudolus and his attempts to win his freedom by helping his young master woo the girl next door.

Plot
In the city of Rome during the reign of Emperor Nero, Pseudolus is "the lyingest, cheatingest, sloppiest slave in all of Rome", whose only wish is to buy his freedom from his master's parents, the henpecked Senex and his overbearing wife, Domina. When he finds out that his master, Senex's handsome but dim son Hero, has fallen in love with the beautiful Philia (destined to be a courtesan) from the house of Marcus Lycus, next door, Pseudolus makes a deal: he will get the girl for Hero in return for his freedom.

Unfortunately, the virgin has been sold to the great Roman soldier Miles Gloriosus, who even now is on his way from conquering Crete to claim her as his bride. In an attempt to fake out the great Gloriosus and buy enough time to come up with a plan that will give Philia to Hero, Pseudolus and his overseer, Hysterium, stage a sit-down orgy for fourteen. Pseudolus informs the captain that his bride is dead and blackmails Hysterium into masquerading as the corpse of Philia to fool the captain and send him heartbroken away; but things go wrong at every turn.

When the supposedly dead "Philia" suddenly comes back to life after the great Gloriosus announces his intention of cutting "her" heart out as a memorial, a chase across Rome and on into the countryside ensues. Eventually, Miles Gloriosus collars Hero, the real Philia, Hysterium, Marcus Lycus, Pseudolus, and Gymnasia, the silent courtesan fancied by Pseudolus, and brings them back to Rome to untangle the skein of deception and see that justice is done.

In the end Hero gets Philia; Senex's next-door neighbor Erronius learns that Philia and Miles Gloriosus are in fact his long-lost children; Marcus Lycus is spared from execution for breaking a marriage contract; Miles Gloriosus takes the gorgeous Gemini twins as his consorts; and Pseudolus gets his freedom, the beautiful and Amazonian Gymnasia to be his wife, and a dowry of 10,000 minae, compliments of Marcus Lycus.

Cast

Cast notes:
 Phil Silvers was suffering from a serious eye infection during filming and didn't trust overseas medical help to treat him properly, so he hid the condition as best he could. Silvers wrote in his autobiography that he became trapped on a high ledge during filming and was unable to see well enough to get down by himself. He did not enjoy his time making the film as much as he should have, which is why he jumped at the chance to star in the Broadway revival of the play.
 Veteran comedian Keaton was terminally ill with cancer at the time of filming. Nevertheless, the 70-year-old was able to perform many of his own stunts, to the amazement of the cast and crew. Forum would be his final film appearance.
 Future Third Doctor Jon Pertwee, brother of screenwriter Michael Pertwee, appears briefly as Crassus, who reports that there is no plague in Crete. He had originally played Lycus in the 1963 West End stage production.
 Kinnear appeared in eight other films directed by Richard Lester: Help! (1965), How I Won the War (1967), The Bed Sitting Room (1969), The Three Musketeers (1973), The Four Musketeers (1974), Juggernaut (1974), Royal Flash (1975) and The Return of the Musketeers (1989).

Songs
 "Comedy Tonight" — Pseudolus and Company
 "Lovely" — Philia and Hero
 "Everybody Ought to Have a Maid" — Pseudolus, Senex, Lycus, and Hysterium
 "Bring Me My Bride" — Miles Gloriosus and Company
 "Lovely" (reprise) — Pseudolus and Hysterium
 "Funeral Sequence" — Pseudolus, Miles Gloriosus and Company
 "Finale" — Company

Songs from the original Broadway score which were cut for the film: "Love I Hear" (Hero), "Free" (Pseudolus and Hero), "Pretty Little Picture" (Pseudolus, Hero, Philia), "I'm Calm" (Hysterium), "Impossible" (Senex and Hero), "That Dirty Old Man" (Domina) and "That'll Show Him" (Philia).

Sondheim's music was adapted for the film version of Forum by Ken Thorne, who previously worked with The Beatles on Help! (1965).

Production
Although the musical had originally been written with Phil Silvers in mind, Zero Mostel starred on Broadway as Pseudolus, and Richard Lester was his choice to direct the film version. Other directors who were considered included Charlie Chaplin, Orson Welles and Mike Nichols. It was filmed at the Samuel Bronston Studios in Madrid, Spain, and on location around that city, on an estimated budget of $2 million. Filming took place from September to November 1965.

Jack Gilford was also re-creating his stage role, as Hysterium, and there are other connections to the Broadway production.  Tony Walton, who designed the production, including the costumes, was also the designer of the Broadway show.  For Walton, who was married to Julie Andrews from 1959 to 1967, Forum came at the beginning of both his film and stage careers: it was his second Broadway production, and his third film - he had designed costumes for Mary Poppins in 1964, and did the overall production design of Fahrenheit 451 in 1966. Bob Simmons, a renowned stunt coordinator, designed and performed many of the action scenes in the film.

Forum is remarkable as one of the few films in which Buster Keaton appeared where he employed a double. Keaton was suffering from terminal cancer at the time – a fact of which he was not aware – and Mick Dillon stood-in for him for the running sequences.  However, Buster performed the pratfall after running into a tree in the chase sequence near the end of the film himself, as no one could properly imitate his pratfalls.

The animated end credits created by Richard Williams feature many houseflies, a reminder of the fly problem the production suffered through when the fruits and vegetables which festooned the set were left out to rot overnight after the end of the shooting day.

George Martin, who with Ethel Martin is credited with the choreography of the film, was the assistant to choreographer Jack Cole on Broadway. (Jerome Robbins also did some uncredited work on the stage show.) Other members of the Forum team are notable as well. Cinematographer Nicholas Roeg moved up to the director's chair to make films such as Performance (1970), with Mick Jagger, Walkabout (1971), Don't Look Now (1973), and The Man Who Fell to Earth (1976) with David Bowie.

Release
Forum premiered in New York City on October 16, 1966 and in London on December 14 of that year. It went into general release in January 1967.

Reception

Box office
The movie obtained $8.5 million in actual box office domestic gross receipts during 1966–67.  When adjusted for current (2019) movie costs, its box office revenue would be equivalent to $69.3 million.   It was the 26th-most-popular film shown in U.S. theaters that year.

The film received about $3 million in rentals in the U.S.

Critical reception
The film received generally positive notices, with a current 86% score on review aggregator website Rotten Tomatoes, based on 22 reviews, with an average of 7.00/10. Variety wrote, "Flip, glib and sophisticated, yet rump-slappingly bawdy and fast-paced, 'Forum' is a capricious look at the seamy underside of classical Rome through a 20th-Century hipster's shades [...] Generally assayed with satirical thrust and on-target accuracy, almost all of the performances are top-rung and thoroughly expert." In a generally favorable review for The New York Times, Vincent Canby praised the "handsomely realistic settings" and determined that "Stephen Sondheim's music and lyrics hold up well," but also found it "hard to decide whether Mr. Lester has gone too far, or not far enough, in translating into film terms the carefully calculated nonsense originally conceived for the theater. He's done a lot of tricky things — with his penchant for quick cutting and juxtaposition of absurd images — but there are times when this style seems oddly at variance with the basic material, which is roughly 2,000 years older than the motion-picture camera."

Philip K. Scheuer of the Los Angeles Times wrote that the film moved so fast that "I simply couldn't ingest it all in one viewing," but "I was able to register enough to realize I was enjoying myself hugely. 'Forum' is a bawdy, ribald romp that rips Rome's Great Society right up the middle, an out-and-out burlesque show that may even—underneath all the frenetic foolery, the flourishing of floozies and the pratfalls—have something satirical and cynical to tell us about nations and why they fall." Richard L. Coe of The Washington Post raved, ""Bawdy, gaudy and lawry, how funny! 'A Funny Thing Happened on the Way to the Forum' has arrived at the Cinema, where laughter should be exploding for months."

Brendan Gill of The New Yorker wrote "I laughed my way mindlessly through ninety percent of the picture," calling the jokes "both awful and exactly right for Mostel, Silvers and company." A review in the UK's Monthly Film Bulletin thought that Lester's fast-moving direction style made for a "curious effect of dislocation," writing that Mostel and Silvers "constantly find the editor snapping at their tails while Lester dashes down some attractive byway and the laugh they probably would have got is stopped short." The review concluded, "Apart from the long chase at the end, which is boring and irrelevant, this is an odd, good-humoured mess of a film, in spite of everything decidedly likeable."

A negative review came from Rex Reed who opined in his review of the tape version of the film's soundtrack album that "the real wit in Stephen Sondheim's score for the very funny Broadway burlesque A Funny Thing Happened on the Way to the Forum was all but totally demolished in Richard Lester's vulgar, witless, and over-stylized film version. All but a handful of the marvelous Sondheim songs were ditched, the few remaining musical numbers were so integrated into the action that they took a back seat to Lester's self-conscious visual gimmicks, and the riotous Zero Mostel was nearly crowded out of the plot completely."

Awards and honors
Music director Ken Thorne received an Academy Award for Best Music, Scoring of Music, Adaptation or Treatment in 1966.  In addition, the film was nominated that year for the Golden Globe Award for Best Motion Picture – Musical or Comedy".

See also
 List of American films of 1966
 Up Pompeii!

References

External links
 
 
 
 
 

1966 films
British musical comedy films
1966 musical comedy films
American musical comedy films
Films based on musicals
Films based on works by Stephen Sondheim
Films directed by Richard Lester
Films set in ancient Rome
Films set in the Roman Empire
Films set in the 1st century
Films shot in Madrid
Films that won the Best Original Score Academy Award
American sex comedy films
British sex comedy films
1960s historical comedy films
British historical comedy films
American historical comedy films
Films based on works by Plautus
American historical musical films
Films scored by Ken Thorne
1960s English-language films
1960s American films
1960s British films